Ilima is an administrative ward in Rungwe District, Mbeya Region, Tanzania. In 2016 the Tanzania National Bureau of Statistics report there were 7,425 people in the ward, from 6,737 in 2012.

Villages and hamlets 
The ward has 6 villages, and 16 hamlets.

 Ilima
 Ibolelo
 Ilima
 Itula
 Ibolela A
 Ibolela B
 Itula A
 Itula B
 Katundulu
 Katundulu
 Lugombo
 Segela
 Lubanda
 Kagindwa
 Lubanda
 Ngujubwaje 'A'
 Kayuki
 Lugombo
 Ngujubwaje 'B'
 Bujesi
 Landani
 Ntuso

References 

Wards of Mbeya Region
Rungwe District
Constituencies of Tanzania